is a Japanese footballer who plays as a defender for  club Kawasaki Frontale and the Japan national team.

Career
Takuma Ominami joined J1 League club Júbilo Iwata in 2016. On May 25, he debuted in J.League Cup (v Kashima Antlers).

Club statistics
.

References

External links
Profile at Júbilo Iwata

1997 births
Living people
Association football people from Aichi Prefecture
Japanese footballers
J1 League players
Júbilo Iwata players
Kashiwa Reysol players
Kawasaki Frontale players
Association football defenders
Footballers at the 2018 Asian Games
Asian Games silver medalists for Japan
Asian Games medalists in football
Medalists at the 2018 Asian Games